Dave Ullrich (born ) is a Canadian musician and entrepreneur.

Early life
Ullrich attended O'Neill Collegiate and Vocational Institute in Oshawa, Ontario and Queens University.

Career
Ullrich performed as drummer and vocalist with bassist Mike O'Neill in the alternative rock duo The Inbreds in the 1990s. The pair released a number of EPs, and singles, as well as seven albums, and were nominated for an East Coast Award and a Juno Award before disbanding in 1998.

Following the band's breakup, Ullrich formed the independent record label Zunior Records, Canada's first online-only music label. "Zunior" is Ullrich's childhood nickname.

In 2005, Ullrich started a band called Egger, with guitarist/singer Paul Linklater, bassist Doug Friesen and drummer/singer Don Kerr. The band features Ullrich's songwriting and singing. Egger released one album, Force Majeure, in 2005, through Zunior Records. The band made one public performance.

In addition to his work with Zunior, Ullrich has worked as an IT consultant.

References

1970s births
Living people
Canadian rock drummers
Canadian male drummers
Canadian songwriters
Canadian music industry executives
Queen's University at Kingston alumni
Musicians from Oshawa
Canadian indie rock musicians
21st-century Canadian drummers
21st-century Canadian male musicians